Fouencamps is a commune in the Somme department in Hauts-de-France in northern France.

Geography

Population

Places of interest
 The village church
 The war memorial
 The Mairie
 Chapel of Saint-Domice, on the road to Hailles
 Chapel of Saint-Ulphe, on the road to Cottenchy

See also
Communes of the Somme department

References

Communes of Somme (department)